Enrica Zunic' is the pseudonym of Enrica Lozito, an Italian science-fiction writer. She lives and works in Turin. Her work is partly inspired by her activities with Amnesty International. In 2003 she won the Premio Italia award for science fiction.

External links
Enrica Zunic's site 

Italian science fiction writers
Writers from Turin
Living people
Year of birth missing (living people)
Place of birth missing (living people)
21st-century Italian women writers